Botmeur is a commune in the Finistère department of Brittany in north-western France.

Population
Inhabitants of Botmeur are called Botmeuriens in French.

See also
Communes of the Finistère department
Parc naturel régional d'Armorique

References

External links

Official website
Mayors of Finistère Association  

Communes of Finistère